Omid Djalili (born 30 September 1965) is a British actor, comedian, and writer.

Early life and education
Djalili was born on 30 September 1965 in Chelsea, London, to Iranian Baháʼí parents. He attended Holland Park School and then Ulster University in Coleraine, Northern Ireland, studying English and theatre studies.

Comedy career
The first significant success of his stand-up comedy career was at the Edinburgh Festival Fringe in 1995 with "Short, Fat Kebab Shop Owner's Son", followed by "The Arab and the Jew" with Jewish comedian Ivor Dembina in 1996.

Djalili has performed in numerous countries, including Australia, Ireland, Sweden, Belgium, Canada and the United States, where he had his own HBO Special.

Djalili took part in a show for Comic Relief after the 2004 Indian Ocean earthquake and tsunami and also in 2005 he appeared on the British TV show Top Gear as a celebrity driver. The same year he broke Edinburgh Festival box office records with over 16,500 ticket sales.

In 2006, Sky Television picked him to be the face of their Saturday night film premières, and he also announced a new tour of the UK called 'No Agenda', from January 2007 until March 2007, covering 23 different dates. The No Agenda tour DVD was released in late 2007.

On 18 March 2007, Djalili was voted by the British public as the 60th best stand-up comedian in a Channel 4 programme "The 100 Greatest Stand-Ups",. On 26 October 2007, he guest-presented the BBC political quiz show Have I Got News for You. The Omid Djalili Show started on BBC1 on 17 November 2007. The series was a mix of sketches and stand-up material. A second series was recorded in late 2008 and began broadcast on BBC 1 on 20 April 2009. He performed on We Are Most Amused on ITV1 to mark Prince Charles's 60th birthday in 2008 and on We Are Most Amused and Amazed to mark his 70th birthday in 2018.

Acting career
Djalili has appeared in a number of films, most notably Gladiator, The Mummy, Mean Machine, The World Is Not Enough, Alien Autopsy, Spy Game, Sky Captain and the World of Tomorrow, Grow Your Own, Notting Hill, Mr Nice, Pirates of the Caribbean: At World's End, Sex and the City 2 and provides his voice in Over the Hedge.

He has observed that he usually appears as a generic Middle Eastern background character in many of these films, often commenting that he appears in the James Bond film as the "Second Azerbaijani oil pipe attendant". He appeared as Nasim in 22 episodes of the U.S. sitcom Whoopi, starring Whoopi Goldberg, and picked up an international film award for Best Supporting Actor in Casanova, starring alongside Heath Ledger and Jeremy Irons.

On 12 February 2009, producer Cameron Mackintosh announced that Djalili would appear as the second Fagin in the new West End production of Oliver!  at the Theatre Royal, Drury Lane, London. Omid took over from Rowan Atkinson, who had been contracted until 18 July 2009.

In 2009, Djalili became the voice of Yusuf Amir in the popular gaming series Grand Theft Auto. He took up the role in the Grand Theft Auto: The Ballad of Gay Tony spin-off game. In 2010, he starred in the David Baddiel-scripted film The Infidel.

In 2010, Djalili starred in a series of TV and cinema adverts for Moneysupermarket.com.

Djalili appeared in the short-lived NBC sitcom The Paul Reiser Show, which was a midseason replacement for the 2010–11 television season.

For the BBC Learning project Off By Heart Shakespeare, Omid played Lord Capulet from Romeo and Juliet and delivered the speech "Hang thee, young baggage, disobedient wretch!"

Djalili appears in the Sky TV adaptation of Moonfleet shooting in Ireland in 2013.

He appeared in the second series of Thunderbirds Are Go in October 2016 as Horse Williams.

Djalili provided his voice in the 2015 stop motion animated comedy Shaun the Sheep Movie.

In 2017 Djalili appeared in an acclaimed performance of Fiddler on the Roof at the Chichester Festival Theatre.

In 2019 he appeared as Dr Martin Lanselius in the BBC adaptation of Philip Pullman's His Dark Materials.

In 2020 he began hosting the ITV game show Winning Combination.

Other activities
In 2008, he was an official festival judge for the Noor Iranian Film Festival. In June 2010, Djalili appeared in a Meltdown Festival concert given by the Philharmonia Orchestra at London's Queen Elizabeth Hall, performing the part of the narrator in 'Rubaiyat', a tone poem by American classical composer Alan Hovhaness which sets the words of Omar Khayyám to music.

He also appeared on the Graham Norton Show on 17 February 2012, alongside Daniel Radcliffe and Cuba Gooding Jr. He now presents the ITV daytime quiz show, Winning Combination.

In February 2022 he shot two pilots of a chat show called Tonight With Omid for the BBC, one version in Persian (for BBC Persia) and another in English.

Awards
Djalili has won awards for his comedy. These include the EMMA Award, Time Out Award, and LWT Comedy Award for Best Stand-up Comedian, Spirit of the Fringe Award as well as the One World Media Award for his Channel 4 documentary, Bloody Foreigners.

He has also been nominated for awards, such as the Perrier Award for Best Comedian, the Gemini Award for Best Comedy Performance of 2003, the South Bank Award for Best Comedy of 2003, the Royal Television Society Award for Best Stand-up, and the European TV Award for his Bloody Foreigners.

Controversy
In 2019, Djalili was criticised for making disparaging remarks about the Welsh language on Twitter after he posted a photograph of a road sign written in Welsh and wrote underneath, "There are worse things than being Welsh, dyslexic & having a terrible stutter. But not many." In response to the unfavourable reaction, Djalili added, "Going to suggest to Sioned a show with the superb replies," referring to Sioned Wiliam, the Head of Comedy at BBC Radio, who is Welsh. However, Djalili declined to apologise. Nigel Owens said that the joke "just wasn't funny", calling it a "cheap, offensive jibe at a nation's language which has needlessly insulted people who have experience with dyslexia or speech impediments".

Personal life
In 1992, Djalili married actress Annabel Knight, with whom he has three children: Isabella, Louis and Daniel. He is a practising Baháʼí.

Djalili is a Chelsea fan, and has appeared many times on the club's in-house channel, Chelsea TV.

Filmography

Film

Television

Video games

Stand-up DVDs
 No Agenda: Live at the London Palladium (26 November 2007)
 Live in London (16 November 2009)
 Tour of Duty (19 November 2012)

See also
 Iranian stand-up comedy

References

External links

 
 
 
 
 
 

1965 births
Living people
20th-century Bahá'ís
20th-century English comedians
20th-century English male actors
21st-century Bahá'ís
21st-century English comedians
21st-century English male actors
Alumni of Ulster University
British Bahá'ís
British male actors of Asian descent
Comedians from London
Edinburgh Comedy Festival
English Bahá'ís
English male film actors
English male television actors
English male voice actors
English people of Iranian descent
English stand-up comedians
People educated at Holland Park School
People from Chelsea, London